The Country Side of Jim Reeves is a studio album by Jim Reeves, released in 1962 on RCA Camden.

Track listing

Charts

References 

1962 albums
Albums produced by Chet Atkins
Jim Reeves albums
RCA Camden albums